The Devil's Debt is the fifth studio album by Scottish band Love and Money, released by Vertical in 2012.

Background
In 2011, Love and Money reunited to perform at Glasgow Royal Concert Hall as part of the Celtic Connections festival, which was followed later in the year with a concert at the SEC Centre. The band's reunion led to the decision to record both new material and some of the songs originally intended for the shelved album The Mother's Boy, which was recorded between 1988's Strange Kind of Love and 1991's Dogs in the Traffic.

The Devil's Debt was released in 2012 and reached No. 60 on the Scottish Albums Chart. The title track was released as a single, with a music video produced by the thirteensquared production company. The video was shot at Govanhill Baths and Òran Mór in Glasgow.

Critical reception
On its release, Alan Morrison of The Herald felt the album contained "some of the best songs James Grant and co have ever written" and praised Grant's "deep crooner of a voice". He added: "Personally, I'd rather listen to this than Strange Kind of Love".

Track listing

Personnel
Love and Money
 James Grant – lead vocals, guitar, string arrangement
 Douglas MacIntyre - guitar
 Paul McGeechan – keyboards
 Gordon Wilson - drums

Additional musicians
 Ewen Vernal - bass
 Kennedy Aitchison - string arrangement
 Monica Queen - vocals
 Fraser Speirs - harmonica (tracks 6, 8, 10)
 Stuart Nisbet - pedal steel guitar (track 8)
 Gwen Stewart - vocals (track 8)
 Deirdre Rutkowski, Louise Rutkowski - vocals (track 10)

Production
 Love and Money - producers
 Paul McGeechan - engineer, mixing, mastering
 Brian McNeil, Brian Young, Clark Neville, Disco Dave, Duncan Cameron, Gavin McCombe, Geoff Martin, Gordy Goudie, Jamie Savage, John Cameron, Johnny Smillie, Keith Mitchell, Scott Campbell, Steven Scott - additional engineers

Other
 Steve Kempster - design
 Anne-Janine Nugent – photography

Charts

References

2012 albums
Love and Money (band) albums